The VB-6 Felix was a precision-guided munition developed by the United States during World War II. It used an infrared seeker to attack targets like blast furnaces or the metal roofs of large factories. The war ended before it could be used operationally.

History
Created by the National Defense Research Committee, Felix relied on infrared to detect and home on heat-emitting targets in clear weather; blast furnaces were considered a particularly practical target for such a weapon, as were the reflective metal roofs of factory buildings. It was this property which earned the weapon its name, after the ability of cats to see in the dark; Felix the Cat was an extremely popular cartoon character at the time.

Felix was a 1000-pound (454 kg) general purpose (GP) bomb with an infrared seeker in the nose and octagonal guidance fins in the tail. Unlike other weapons, such as the German Fritz X, Felix was autonomous once launched, although there was a flare in the tail for tracking.

Successful trials led to Felix being put in production in 1945, but the Pacific War ended before it entered combat.

Dove
A naval version of the Felix, the ASM-N-4 Dove, was approved in 1944; in 1946 the project was transferred to Eastman Kodak, and in 1949 a contract for 20 prototype weapons was issued. Dove's infrared seeker was expected to be capable of correcting  aiming errors; trials took place through 1952, but no production was undertaken.

See also
 Fritz X
 Azon
 GB-4
 Bat
 LBD-1 Gargoyle
 List of anti-ship missiles

References
Citations

Bibliography

External links

World War II aerial bombs of the United States
World War II weapons of the United States
Guided bombs of the United States